The Byrrill Creek is a perennial stream located in Northern Rivers region in the state of New South Wales, Australia. It is the namesake of the locality of the same name.

Course and features
Byrrill Creek rises below Bar Mountain on the eastern slopes of the Tweed Range, near Byrrill Creek, and flows generally northeast, and then east, before reaching its confluence with the Tweed River near Terragon. The river descends  over its  course.

In 2007, the federal government proposed damming the Rous River, Oxley River and Byrill Creek. Local opposition to the plan was formed via the Save the Caldera Rivers Campaign, in an effort to stop the proposed dams from being built.

See also

 Rivers of New South Wales
 List of rivers of New South Wales (A-K)
 List of rivers of Australia

References

Northern Rivers
Rivers of New South Wales